Halina Kossobudzka (29 August 1920 – 26 July 1994) was a Polish actress. She appeared in more than twenty films and television shows between 1961 and 1987.

Selected filmography
 Panienka z okienka (1964)

References

External links

1920 births
1994 deaths
Polish film actresses
People from Grudziądz